The Bette Midler Show is an HBO television special of one of Bette Midler's tours entitled "The Depression Tour," shot at the Cleveland Music Hall during February 1976 and also issued on Midler's album Live at Last.

The show features many of Bette's popular songs, such as "Boogie Woogie Bugle Boy", "Friends", "In The Mood", "Hello In There", and "Lullaby of Broadway" As well as dazzling the audience with her spontaneous wit with her 'Wonderful Sophie Tucker Jokes' and her special 'The Vicki Eydie Show'.

The original HBO broadcast ran 134 minutes, including material from both of her Cleveland performances and a 5-minute intermission. When it was released on VHS, Betamax and CED Videodisc in 1984 by Embassy Home Video, it was severely shortened to 84-minutes. Performances of "Birds," "Shiver Me Timbers," the entire "Story of Nanette," a Harlettes-only musical number and countless jokes were removed.

The special has never officially been issued on DVD, but bootlegs are rampant and clips from both versions have surfaced on YouTube.

Cast and Personnel

Cast
Bette Midler – Herself

Harlettes
Sharon Redd – Harlettes – Vocals
Ula Hedwig – Harlettes – Vocals
Charlotte Crossley – Harlettes – Vocals

Musicians
Betsy And The Blowboys – The Orchestra
Don York – Keyboards
Lou Volpe – Guitar
Richard Trifan – Keyboards
Ira "Buddy" Williams – Drums
Jaroslav Jakubovic – Reeds
Miles Krasner – Trumpet
Francisco Centeno – Bass
Joseph Mero – Percussion and Vibes
Elizabeth Kane – Harp

Personnel
Toni Basil – Choreographer
Aaron Russo – Producer
Don York – Musical Director
Bruce VilanchJerry Blatt – Special Material

Acts

Act I
 Friends/Oh My My
 I Sold My Heart To The Junkman
 Birds (HBO Version)
 Comic Relief
 In the Mood
 Hurry on Down
 Shiver me Timbers (HBO Version)
 The Vicki Eydie Show: Around the World, Istanbul, Fiesta in Rio, South Sea's scene, I'm Wishing/One Song, A Dream is a Wish Your Heart Makes,
 Lullaby of Broadway Intermission: You're Moving Out TodayAct II
 Roll Me Through The Rushes (The Harlettes) (HBO Version)
 Delta Dawn Long John Blues Those Wonderful Sophie Tucker Jokes The Story of Nanette: Nanette, Alabama Song, Drinking Again, Mr. Rockefeller, Ready to Begin Again, Do You Wanna Dance? (HBO Version)
 Fried Eggs
 Hello in there
 Finale: Up the Ladder to the Roof, Boogie Woogie Bugle Boy, Friends

For further info see Live at Last (Bette Midler album)

External links
 Bette Midler Show information on IMDb
 Bette Midler Show on Amazon

References

1976 films
American musical films
1970s musical films
Bette Midler video albums
1970s English-language films
1970s American films